Broad & Bright is a corporate law firm headquartered in Beijing, China. It currently has offices in Beijing, Shanghai, Guangzhou, Hong Kong, Tokyo and Los Angeles.

History
Broad & Bright was founded in Beijing in 2005 by Yuan Changchuan, Liu Hongchuan, Ji Jun and Feng Yao.

In January 2011, Broad & Bright hired a team of nine partners and associates from the Shanghai office of Run Ming.

Broad & Bright joined the international multidisciplinary professional services network MSI Global Alliance in March 2012, becoming the only China-based member.

Main practice areas
Broad & Bright's main practice areas include:

capital markets;
corporate;
employment;
financial services regulation;
insurance;
intellectual property;
litigation and dispute resolution;
mergers and acquisitions;
real estate;
restructuring and insolvency; and
tax.

See also 
List of largest Chinese law firms
Legal History of China
Chinese law

References

External links
Broad & Bright

Law firms of China
Law firms established in 2005